Federico Vicente Lanzillota (born 1 December 1992) is an Argentine professional footballer who plays as a goalkeeper for Argentinos Juniors.

Career
Lanzillota started his career in 2013 with Nueva Chicago of Primera B Nacional, making his debut on 2 June 2013 versus Douglas Haig. He made two more appearances in 2012–13, prior to seven in the 2015 Argentine Primera División which turned out to be his last games for the club. In January 2016, Lanzillota completed a move to Argentinos Juniors. His first match for Argentinos came in the Primera División in a 0–3 home defeat to Atlético Tucumán in March. The club won promotion in 2016–17, but prior to the start of the 2017–18 season he suffered a cruciate ligament injury which took him out of action for the next six months.

On 29 July 2019, Lanzillota was loaned for five months to Chilean Primera División side Palestino. Just three appearances followed due to the goalkeeper experiencing a knee injury, which required surgery. Lanzillota returned to Argentinos in early December, though would rejoin Palestino on fresh loan terms in January 2020; he joined for twelve months, whilst also renewing his contract until 30 June 2023 with his parent club. He wouldn't play for the Chileans until 14 November 2020, due to the aforementioned surgery and the COVID-19 pandemic, with fourteen appearances eventually arriving in 2020. He returned to Argentinos in February 2021.

Career statistics
.

Honours
Argentinos Juniors
Primera B Nacional: 2016–17

References

External links

1997 births
Living people
People from La Matanza Partido
Argentine people of Italian descent
Argentine footballers
Association football goalkeepers
Argentine expatriate footballers
Expatriate footballers in Chile
Argentine expatriate sportspeople in Chile
Primera Nacional players
Argentine Primera División players
Chilean Primera División players
Nueva Chicago footballers
Argentinos Juniors footballers
Club Deportivo Palestino footballers
Sportspeople from Buenos Aires Province